Aleksandr Andeyevich Sergeyev (born 27 February 1994) is a Russian canoeist. He competed in the men's K-4 500 metres event at the 2020 Summer Olympics.

References

External links
 

1994 births
Living people
Russian male canoeists
Olympic canoeists of Russia
Canoeists at the 2020 Summer Olympics
Place of birth missing (living people)
Universiade medalists in canoeing
Universiade gold medalists for Russia
Medalists at the 2013 Summer Universiade
Canoeists at the 2015 European Games
Canoeists at the 2019 European Games
European Games medalists in canoeing
European Games gold medalists for Russia
European Games silver medalists for Russia